The Zoological Society of Montreal was founded in 1964 as a support for the creation of a zoo in Montreal. This founding project was shelved for lack of funding but the Society lived on under the direction of Gerald T. Iles, the former head of the Manchester Zoological Gardens. The Zoological Society's help in the creation of the Montreal Aquarium and Dolphin Arena (1967-1991) at Expo '67 cemented the organization as a leader in zoological practice and wildlife conservation.

From its founding, the driving objectives of the Society were "to promote and develop among the public an interest in, and knowledge of, wildlife and to encourage the study of biology and kindred sciences; To encourage the protection of wildlife and, in particular, the wildlife of Canada; and to publish a journal, to hold regular meetings and to organize field trips." Their primary mandate was to bring attention to conservation issues that plagued the wildlife of Canada.

In 1969, the Society would incorporate a new organization under its umbrella, the Zoological Society of Canada (1969-2011). Although the Canadian Society ran under the same direction and administration as the Montreal Society, the name was adopted to give the Society recognition in national affairs. The name would come into use and disuse at different points in the Society's existence, depending on their project aims at that time.

During its early period, the Society became heavily involved in Expo '67, and the post-Expo exhibition that followed named Man and His World. When their proposal for an ark pavilion devoted to wildlife was turned down, Iles turned his attention to caring for two lion cubs brought to Montreal to be part of the Ethiopian pavilion. In 1975, the Society won the contract to open their own pavilion at Man and His World, which was entitled "Vanishing Wildlife" and ran for four years.

In subsequent years, the Society continued to focus on large scale projects such as a proposed wildlife park in Montreal's West Island and other nature reserves around Quebec. They also concentrated on hosting events, guest lectures, and field trips. Although most trips were in or around Quebec, they also made safaris to Africa, South America, and the Galapagos Islands. Prominent guest lecturers included author Farley Mowat, Jane Goodall, British naturalist Gerald Durrell, and artist Robert Bateman. At the same time, the Society became greatly involved in whale watching and conservation, and became the first organization to host whale watching excursions in the St. Lawrence River. They organized whale watching trips each summer. Apart from events and excursions, the Zoological Society focused its attention on effecting change on a government and societal level. They donated to zoological and conservationist causes, adopted animals and plants, and often lobbied government officials on environmental issues.

The Society began with just 30 members and grew to around 800 members at its peak, including students, professionals, and hobbyists. It was organized through an Executive Committee with a president at its head and a group of directors. There were also committees formed at different points in time including the Nominating Committee, responsible for nominating other committees, the Park Committee, responsible for creating a proposed wildlife park in Montreal, and the Project Committee, formed in 1970 under George Midgley, who organized the year's activities.

The Zoological Society dissolved in June 2016, citing a lack of membership and volunteers as its cause.

References

External links 

 Zoological Society of Montreal fonds, MSG 1164, McGill University Library & Archives.

Zoological societies
1964 establishments in Canada
Organizations based in Montreal
Organizations established in 1964
Nature conservation organizations based in Canada
Whale watching
Wildlife conservation in Canada